Marpessa was a town of ancient Greece on the island of Paros. 

Although it was likely associated with Mount Marpessa, its site is unlocated.

References

Populated places in the ancient Aegean islands
Former populated places in Greece
Paros
Lost ancient cities and towns